Chalermkiat Boonnet (born August 12, 1989) simply known as Tum or Top (Thai: ต๊อบ), is a professional footballer from Ubon Ratchathani Province, Thailand. He currently plays for Ubon Ratchathani in the Thai League 3.

Clubs

Honor

Ubon UMT United

Regional League Division 2:
Winners : 2015
Regional League North-East Division
 Runner-up : 2015

References

goal.com
supersubthailand.com
siamsport.co.th

1989 births
Living people
Chalermkiat Boonnet
Chalermkiat Boonnet
Association football defenders
Chalermkiat Boonnet
Chalermkiat Boonnet
Chalermkiat Boonnet
Chalermkiat Boonnet
Chalermkiat Boonnet
Chalermkiat Boonnet
Chalermkiat Boonnet
Chalermkiat Boonnet
Chalermkiat Boonnet